Amber Gaylor is an association footballer who plays as a midfielder for Billericay Town F.C. Women in the FA Women's National League South East division.

Gaylor made twelve appearances in the FA Women's Super League in the 2018–19 season for Yeovil Town, scoring one goal.

In January 2020 she moved from the London Lionesses to join Crystal Palace. She and Siobhan Wilson were both signed by the manager Dean Davenport.

References

1995 births
Living people
Women's association football midfielders
Women's Super League players
London Bees players
Millwall Lionesses L.F.C. players
Yeovil Town L.F.C. players
London City Lionesses players
Crystal Palace F.C. (Women) players
English women's footballers